Dmitry Vladimirovich Gaag (Дмитрий Владимирович Гааг; born March 20, 1971 in Karaganda) is an athlete from Kazakhstan, who competes in triathlon. Gaag competed at the first Olympic triathlon at the 2000 Summer Olympics.  He took fourth place with a total time of 1:49:03.57.

He competed again at the second Olympic triathlon at the 2004 Summer Olympics, dropping to twenty-fifth place with a time 1:56:28.97.

On September 6, 2008 Gaag was banned for two years beginning June 20, 2008 after testing positive for recombinant erythropoietin (EPO).

Notes

References
 

1971 births
Living people
Sportspeople from Karaganda
Kazakhstani male triathletes
Olympic triathletes of Kazakhstan
Doping cases in triathlon
Triathletes at the 2000 Summer Olympics
Triathletes at the 2004 Summer Olympics
Triathletes at the 2008 Summer Olympics
Triathletes at the 2010 Asian Games
Triathletes at the 2006 Asian Games
Asian Games medalists in triathlon
Asian Games gold medalists for Kazakhstan
Asian Games bronze medalists for Kazakhstan
Medalists at the 2006 Asian Games
Medalists at the 2010 Asian Games